Der-Tsai Lee (aka. D. T. Lee) is a Taiwanese computer scientist, known for his work in computational geometry. For many years he was a professor at Northwestern University. He has been a distinguished research fellow of the Institute for Information Science at the Academia Sinica in Taipei, Taiwan since 1998. From 1998 to 2008, he was director of this institute. He was the 14th President of National Chung Hsing University from August 1, 2011.

Lee received a B.S. degree in electrical engineering from
National Taiwan University in 1971, an M.S. from  the University of Illinois at Urbana-Champaign in 1976, and a Ph.D. from UIUC under the supervision of Franco Preparata in 1978. After holding a faculty position at Northwestern University for 20 years, he moved to the Academia Sinica in 1998. He also holds faculty positions at National Taiwan University, National Taiwan University of Science and Technology, and National Chiao Tung University. He is a Fellow of the IEEE and the ACM. He was elected as the Academician of Academia Sinica, Taiwan in 2004. He also won the Humboldt Research Award in 2007 and elected as the member of The Academy of Sciences for the Developing World (also known as Third World Academy of Sciences) (TWAS) in 2008. In 2010, he became the Humboldt Ambassador Scientist. He has published near 200 research papers, and an ISI highly cited researcher. He is editor in chief of the International Journal of Computational Geometry and Applications.

He was awarded the German-Taiwanese Friendship Medal by Michael Zickerick, the Director General of the German Institute Taipei, in May 2014.

References

Researchers in geometric algorithms
National Taiwan University alumni
American people of Taiwanese descent
Grainger College of Engineering alumni
Northwestern University faculty
Fellows of the Association for Computing Machinery
Fellow Members of the IEEE
Living people
1949 births
Taiwanese computer scientists
Members of Academia Sinica
Place of birth missing (living people)
Presidents of universities and colleges in Taiwan
Academic staff of the National Chung Hsing University